Par'hyponoian, from Greek ὑπόνοια hypónoia, "logical assumption", is a logical or thought trope, consisting in the replacement of a second part in a phrase or a text, that would have been logically expected from the first part.

Examples 

The pun is based on the unexpected modification of a well-known idiom.

“A polarizing figure” would have been expected to be said about the president Hugo Chávez.

Former Vice-president Dick Cheney visited a zoo, where he saw a grizzly bear. There was a powerful moment between the blood-thirsty, ruthless beast with claws and fangs, and on the other side, the honey-eating furry mammal in the cage. 

”Blood-thirsty beast” would have been expected to define a bear.

See also 
 Figure of speech
 Non sequitur 

Poetic devices